Crystal Lake is a lake in South Dakota, in the United States.

Crystal Lake was so named on account of its crystal-clear water.

See also
List of lakes in South Dakota

References

Lakes of South Dakota
Lakes of Aurora County, South Dakota